Trachones Field (Gipedo Trachonon), known locally as Galaxias, is a 457-seat track and field stadium in Trachones, Alimos, Athens, Greece. It is the seat of the local soccer team A.O.T. Alimos F.C.

References

External links
 Trachones F.C.

Football venues in Greece
Multi-purpose stadiums in Greece
Sports venues in Attica